Peatling Magna (also once known as “Great Petlyng” and later as “Great Peatling”) is a village in Harborough district, south Leicestershire. The population of the civil parish at the 2011 census was 210. It lies 3.7 km north-east of Ashby Magna and 2.9 km north-north-east of Peatling Parva.

Church
The church of All Saints is mainly of the 14th and 15th centuries and contains some fine examples of carved woodwork of different periods.

Medieval notableness
In 1265, Peatling Magna stepped onto the national stage when, after the battle of Evesham, the villages refused to co-operate with men of the victorious royal forces, on the grounds that the latter were “going against the welfare of the community of the realm”.  The fracas which followed eventually led to the village appearing in court, as recorded in the Plea Rolls of 1266, in the person of the reeve and four men as representatives of “the community of the vill.” F. M. Powicke saw the case as indicative of the penetration of communal ideas, local and national, to the smallest village level in 13th century England.
In 1384, Peatling Magna was mentioned as "Great Petlyng" in a pardon granted to Thomas Astell, Thomas Mathew, and John Scot of "Great Petlyng" for the death of Nicholas Man of "Great Petlyng", as William de Skypwith and other justices assigned to deliver the gaol (jail) at Leicester Castle found that Astell and the others had acted in self-defence. (Just how three men killed one man in "self-defence" was not explained.)

Notes

Further reading
Helen Cam, Lawfinders and Lawmakers in Medieval England (Merlin 1962)

External links

Villages in Leicestershire
Civil parishes in Harborough District